Bazunu is a surname. Notable people with the surname include:

Gavin Bazunu (born 2002), Irish football goalkeeper
Rex Bazunu (born 1953), Nigerian sprinter